Busscar Ônibus S.A. was a Brazilian bus manufacturer that built coaches, trolleybuses, charter and tour buses, founded on 17 September 1946.  The company was based in Joinville in the south of Brazil, where it had industrial premises that cover , including a building of  The Busscar Ônibus S.A. was defunct on 27 September 2012.

History

The business had its origins in a firm created on September 17, 1946, when two brothers of Swedish descent, Augusto Bruno Nielson and Eugênio Nielson, opened a carpentry shop in Joinville, where they made wooden furniture, window frames and desks. One year later, Nielson & Brother remodeled the first bus body. In 1949 they built a bus body entirely in wood, attached to a large Chevrolet chassis.

This was the starting point of a business that in a few decades would turn into an important bus manufacturing company in the American market.

When Harold Nielson (Augusto's elder son) joined the company in 1956 it was en route to becoming the segment leader in Brazil, with innovative and revolutionary products, such as the Diplomata model in 1961, the Urbanuss in 1987, the Panorâmico DD in 1998, and many others.

In 1990, the business, by then called Carrocerias Nielson, launched a new family of vehicles and changed its name to Busscar Ônibus, creating a mark that is still known today in international and Brazilian markets, despite the company's later demise.

On 27 September 2012, the Brazilian Judiciary of Santa Catarina declared the bankruptcy of Busscar due to the effects from economic crisis of 2008.

The judge of the 5th Civil Court of Joinville, Walter Santin Júnior, approved in a final ruling on 21 March 2017, the purchase of Joinville factory. For the business is to be deposited R$9.4 million in cash and another R$57.74 million to be paid in 52 installments with monetary correction. None of the new projects and new company name are known, however since May 2017, new contracts employment could be signed after End of  the Justice process.

On June 12, 2017 Maurício Lourenço da Cunha represented by Sergio Souza assumes the factories and gave a name Carbuss - Indústria de Carrocerias Catarinense Ltda.

Former models

Transit buses:
 Busscar Urbanuss 
 Busscar Urbanuss Ecoss II 
 Busscar Urbanuss Pluss
 Pluss Híbrido
 Pluss Low Floor
 Pluss Troley
 Pluss Tour
 Articulado Low Floor
 Nielson Urbanus 
 Busscar Urbanus I 
 Busscar Urbanus II 
 Busscar Urbanus II SS

Coaches:
 Panorâmico DD
 Jum Buss 400
 Jum Buss 380
 Jum Buss 360
 Vissta Buss Elegance 360
 Vissta Buss Elegance 380
 Vissta Buss HI
 Vissta Buss LO
 El Buss 340
 El Buss 320
 Interbuss
 Nielson Diplomata 2.40 
 Nielson Diplomata 2.50 
 Nielson Diplomata 2.60 
 Nielson Diplomata 310 
 Nielson Diplomata 330
 Nielson Diplomata 350
 Nielson Diplomata 380
 El Buss 320 I
 El Buss 340 I
 El Buss 360 I
 Jum Buss 340 I
 Jum Buss 360 I
 Jum Buss 380 I
 Jum Buss 340T I
 Jum Buss 360T I
 Jum Buss 380T I
 El Buss 320 II
 El Buss 340 II
 Jum Buss 360 II
 Jum Buss 380 II
 Jum Buss 400 Panorâmico 
 Interbus
 Vissta Buss

References

External links

 Official website
 Busscar history
 Busscar of Colombia

Bus manufacturers of Brazil
Defunct motor vehicle manufacturers of Brazil
Companies based in Joinville
Trolleybus manufacturers
Vehicle manufacturing companies established in 1946
Vehicle manufacturing companies disestablished in 2012
1946 establishments in Brazil
2012 disestablishments in Brazil
Electric vehicle manufacturers of Brazil